William Lindsey House may refer to:

William Lindsey House (Fall River, Massachusetts), listed on the National Register of Historic Places in Bristol County, Massachusetts
William Lindsey House (Yakima, Washington), listed on the National Register of Historic Places in Yakima County, Washington